Ilya Andreyevich Buryukin (born 15 January 2000) is a Russian football player who plays for FC Irtysh Omsk.

Club career
He made his debut in the Russian Football National League for FC Irtysh Omsk on 8 August 2020 in a game against FC Nizhny Novgorod, as a starter.

References

External links
 
 Profile by Russian Football National League
 

2000 births
Sportspeople from Omsk
Living people
Russian footballers
Association football midfielders
FC Lada-Tolyatti players
PFC Krylia Sovetov Samara players
FC Irtysh Omsk players